Jaramataia is a municipality located in the Brazilian state of Alagoas. Its population is 5,761 (2020) and its area is 104 km².

References

Municipalities in Alagoas